Maryia Lohvinava (born ) is a Belarusian female  track cyclist. She competed in three events at the 2012 UCI Track Cycling World Championships.

References

External links
 Profile at cyclingarchives.com

1992 births
Living people
Belarusian track cyclists
Belarusian female cyclists
Place of birth missing (living people)